Epiphyas euraphodes is a species of moth of the family Tortricidae. It is found in Australia, where it has been recorded from New South Wales.

The wingspan is 15–16 mm. The forewings are whitish, sometimes with slight patchy pale-ochreous suffusion. The markings are fuscous. The hindwings are grey.

References

Moths described in 1916
Epiphyas